Margarita Nikolayevna Kozhina (August 1, 1925 – August 11, 2012) was a Soviet and Russian linguist, Doctor of Philology, professor (1973), Honoured scientist of Russian Federation (1991), the founder of Perm school of functional stylistics, famous both within Russia and abroad, the founder of Russian language and stylistics department at Perm State University.

Sources
 Page, dedicated to Margarita Kozhina, at Perm State National Research University's Official Website.
 Margarita Kozhina at Russian Wikipedia: Кожина, Маргарита Николаевна // Википедия, свободная энциклопедия.

References

1925 births
2012 deaths
Linguists from Russia
Perm State University alumni
Academic staff of Perm State University
People from Kyshtym
Linguists from the Soviet Union
20th-century linguists
Russian studies scholars
Russian language
Women linguists